Mount Silverthrone is  glaciated mountain summit located in Denali National Park and Preserve, in the Alaska Range, in the U.S. state of Alaska. The first ascent of this peak was made April 12, 1945, by Norman Bright and Frank P. Foster. It was so named by the U.S. Army Forces Cold Weather test party because of its stately appearance at the head of Brooks Glacier.

Climate

Based on the Köppen climate classification, Mount Silverthrone is located in a subarctic climate zone with long, cold, snowy winters, and cool summers. Temperatures can drop below −20 °C with wind chill factors below −30 °C. This climate supports glaciers on it slopes including the Brooks Glacier. Precipitation runoff from the mountain drains into tributaries of the McKinley River, which in turn is part of in the Tanana River drainage basin. The months May through June offer the most favorable weather for climbing or viewing.

See also

List of mountain peaks of North America
List of mountain peaks of the United States
List of mountain peaks of Alaska

References

 Mount Silverthrone in the Canadian Mountain Encyclopedia

External links
 Weather forecast: Mount Silverthrone

Alaska Range
Mountains of Denali Borough, Alaska
Mountains of Alaska
Mount Silverthrone
Mountains of Denali National Park and Preserve